Suzuki Harunobu was a Japanese designer of woodblock print art in the  style. He was an innovator, the first to produce full-color prints in 1765, rendering obsolete the former modes of two- and three-color prints. Harunobu used many special techniques, and depicted a wide variety of subjects, from classical poems to contemporary beauties. During his lifetime and shortly afterwards, many artists imitated his style. A few, such as Harushige, even boasted of their ability to forge the work of the great master. Much about Harunobu's life is unknown.

Influences

Though some scholars assert that Harunobu was originally from Kyoto, pointing to possible influences from Nishikawa Sukenobu, much of his work, in particular his early work, is in the Edo style. His work shows evidence of influences from many artists, including Torii Kiyomitsu, Ishikawa Toyonobu, the Kawamata school, and the Kanō school. However, the strongest influence upon Harunobu was the painter and printmaker Nishikawa Sukenobu, who may have been Harunobu's direct teacher.

Artistic career

Little is known of Harunobu's early life; his birthplace and birthdate are unknown, but it is believed he grew up in Kyoto. It is said he was 46 at his death in 1770. Unlike most  artists, Harunobu used his real name rather than an artist name. He was from a samurai family, and had an ancestor who was a retainer of Tokugawa Ieyasu in Mikawa Province; this Suzuki accompanied Ieyasu to Edo when the latter had his capital built there. Harunobu's grandfather Shigemitsu and father Shigekazu were stripped of their  status when they were found to be involved in financing of gambling and other activities; they were exiled from Edo and relocated to Kyoto. At some point, Harunobu became a student of the  master Nishikawa Sukenobu.

Harunobu began his career in the style of the Torii school, creating many works which, while skillful, were not innovative and did not stand out. It was only through his involvement with a group of literati samurai that Harunobu tackled new formats and styles.

In 1764, as a result of his social connections, he was chosen to aid these samurai in their amateur efforts to create . Harunobu's calendars, which incorporated the calculations of the lunar calendar into their images, would be exchanged at Edo gatherings and parties.

These calendar prints would be the very first  (brocade prints). As a result of the wealth and connoisseurship of his samurai patrons, Harunobu exclusively created these prints using the best materials available. Harunobu experimented with better woods for the woodblocks, using cherry wood instead of catalpa, and used not only more expensive colors, but also a thicker application of the colors, in order to achieve a more opaque effect.

Just 20 years previously, the invention of  had made it possible to print in three or four colors; Harunobu applied tis new technique to  prints using up to ten different colors on a single sheet of paper. The new technique depended on using notches and wedges to hold the paper in place and keep the successive color printings in register. Harunobu was the first  artist to consistently use more than three colors in each print. , unlike their predecessors, were full-color images. As the technique was first used in a calendar, the year of their origin can be traced precisely to 1765.

In a few special cases, notably his famous set of eight prints entitled  (Eight Parlor Views), the patron's name appears on the print along with, or in place of, Harunobu's own.

Between 1765 and 1770, Harunobu created over twenty illustrated books and over one thousand color prints, along with a number of paintings. He came to be regarded as the master of  during these last years of his life, and was widely imitated until, a number of years after his death, his style was eclipsed by that of new artists, including Katsukawa Shunshō and Torii Kiyonaga.

Style
His figures are all very thin and light; some critics say that all his figures look like children. However, it is these same young girls who epitomize Harunobu's personal style. Richard Lane describes this as "Harunobu's special province, one in which he surpassed all other Japanese artists - eternal girlhood in unusual and poetic settings". Though his compositions, like most  prints, may be said to be fairly simple overall, it is the overall composition that concerned Harunobu. Unlike many of his predecessors, he did not seek to have the girls' kimono dominate the viewer's attention.

Harunobu is also acclaimed as being one of the greatest artists of this period in depicting ordinary urban life in Edo. His subjects are not restricted to geisha, courtesans, actors, and sumo wrestlers, but include street vendors, errand boys, and others who help to fill in the gaps in describing the culture of this time. His work is rich in literary allusion, and he often quotes Japanese classical poetry, but the accompanying illustrations often gently poke fun at the subject.

Many of his prints have a solid, single-color background, created by a technique called . Though many other artists used the same technique, Harunobu is generally regarded as having used it to the strongest effect. The colored background sets a mood and tone for the entire image.

Collections 

Harunobu's work is held in several museums worldwide, including:

 Asian Art Museum
 British Museum
 Brooklyn Museum
 Harvard Art Museums
 Hill-Stead Museum
 Kislak Collection of Japanese Prints
 Metropolitan Museum of Art
 Museum of Fine Arts, Boston
 National Museum of Korea
 Nelson-Atkins Museum of Art
 Philadelphia Museum of Art
 Portland Art Museum
 Suntory Museum of Art
 University of Michigan Museum of Art
 Victoria and Albert Museum
 Virginia Museum of Fine Arts

In philately
Harunobu's works have been featured three times in commemorative postage stamps issued by the Japanese post office:
 1957 Philatelic Week
 1969 16th Universal Postal Union Congress
 1981 Philatelic Week (se-tenant pair)

His works have also been depicted in topical stamps from the Federated States of Micronesia, Sierra Leone and St Vincent.

Works

Notes

Works cited

 Forbes, Andrew ; Henley, David (2012). Suzuki Harunobu: 100 Beauties. Chiang Mai: Cognoscenti Books. ASIN: B00AC2NB8Y
 
Kurth, Julius. Suzuki Harunobu. Munchen: R. Piper & Co., 1923. ASIN: B000K0A7DK
Kondo, Ichitaro. Suzuki Harunobu (Kodansha Library of Japanese Art Vol. 7). Charles E. Tuttle (1956).  ASIN: B0007KFY7C
 Lane, Richard. (1978).  Images from the Floating World, The Japanese Print. Oxford: Oxford University Press. ;  OCLC 5246796
Waterhouse, David B. "Harunobu". Kodansha Encyclopedia of Japan. (vol. 3); Tokyo: Kodansha Ltd. 1983.Sisto Pascale

External links

Catching Cicadas by Suzuki Harunobu, 1765
Suzuki Harunobu and the Stylistic Evolution of Shunga by Honolulu Museum of Art
Suzuki Harunobu and the Reconsideration of Classical Literature by Honolulu Museum of Art

1725 births
1770 deaths
Ukiyo-e artists
18th-century Japanese artists
Shunga by artist